HMS Orpheus was a 36-gun Apollo-class fifth-rate frigate of the Royal Navy launched in 1809 from Deptford Dockyard. She was broken up in 1819.

Construction
Ordered on 27 February 1807 and laid down in August 1808 at Deptford Dockyard. Launched on 12 August 1809 and completed on 21 September 1809.

Service

Orpheus also saw service in the War of 1812. While in Long Island Sound, she chased the American privateer Holkar and ran her aground, before destroying Holkar by cannon fire.

Orpheus was part of the British patrolling squadron in Long Island Sound. When the British fleet encountered an American fleet, commanded by Stephen Decatur it chased them to New London where the American fleet escaped. The British squadron there formed a blockade, confining the American fleet until the end of the war.

On 27 April Orpheus chased the American ship Whampoa on shore near Newport, Rhode Island. Whampoa had been sailing from Lorient. The British took possession of Whampoa but then abandoned her due to fire from the shore.

Fate
She was broken up at Chatham Dockyard in August 1819.

Citations and references
Citations

References
 
 Gardiner, Robert; The Heavy Frigate, Conway Maritime Press, London 1994.
 Lyon, David and Winfield, Rif; The Sail and Steam Navy List, 1815–1889, Chatham Publishing, 2004. .
 
 
 Winfield, Rif; British Warships in the Age of Sail, 1793–1817: Design, Construction, Careers and Fates, 2nd edition, Seaforth Publishing, 2008. .

1809 ships
Ships built in Deptford
Apollo-class frigates
Frigates of the Royal Navy
War of 1812 ships of the United Kingdom